Jacob Scharpf was a member of the Wisconsin State Assembly.

Biography
Scharpf was born on September 4, 1874 in Herman, Dodge County, Wisconsin. He attended high school in Juneau, Wisconsin.

Assembly career
Scharpf was a member of the Assembly during the 1919 session. He was a Republican.

References

People from Herman, Dodge County, Wisconsin
Republican Party members of the Wisconsin State Assembly
1874 births
Year of death missing